The İslâm Ansiklopedisi (İA) is a Turkish academic encyclopedia for Islamic studies published by .

Its most recent 44-volume edition, called Türkiye Diyanet Vakfı İslâm Ansiklopedisi (TDV İA or DİA), was completed between 1988 and 2013, with two supplementary volumes published in 2016. It contains 16,855 articles in total.

Edition history
Initially, in 1939, the İA was proposed to be a translation of the first Encyclopaedia of Islam (EI1, 1913–1938) into the Turkish language because the EI1 had only been introduced in English, French and German.

However, while preparing the İslâm Ansiklopedisi many articles of the EI1 were revised, expanded and corrected, and the work ultimately "had the dual purpose of amending Orientalist scholarship and elaborating on the Turkish contribution to Islamic tradition".

The result was that the İslâm Ansiklopedisi became a work consisting of 15 volumes instead of the originally proposed five. Some articles of the İA have been in turn included into the second Encyclopaedia of Islam (EI2, 1960–2007), and EI2 articles refer to many articles of the İA.

From 1966 until 1987, the editor-in-chief of İslâm Ansiklopedisi was the Tahsin Yazıcı, a Turkish scholar of Persian literature, who personally contributed more than 150 articles to the work. The previous editor-in-chief was Ahmed Ateş.

Since 1988, a new İslâm Ansiklopedisi has been in preparation, the Türkiye Diyanet Vakfı İslâm Ansiklopedisi (DİA), which is a completely original work. DİA was completed in 44 volumes in December 2013. Two additional (supplement) volumes are being prepared. The scientific quality of the encyclopedia is recognized by Turkologists and Turkish-speaking scholars of Islamic studies.

De facto standard for Ottoman Turkish transliteration
The transliteration system of the İslâm Ansiklopedisi has become a de facto standard in Oriental studies for the transliteration of Ottoman Turkish texts. For phonetic transcription the dictionaries of New Redhouse, Karl Steuerwald and Ferit Develioğlu have become standard. Another transliteration system is that of the Deutsche Morgenländische Gesellschaft (DMG), which handles any Turkic language written in the Arabic script. There are few differences between the İA and the DMG transliteration systems.

First Edition volumes (İA)

Second Edition volumes (TDVİA)

See also 

 Encyclopaedia of Islam
 Encyclopædia Iranica

References

Further reading
Aptin Khanbaghi Encyclopedias about Muslim civilisations, chapter İslam Ansiklopedisi: İslam Alemi Tarih, Coğrafya, Etnografya ve Biyografya Lugati, p. 285 Online

External links
İslâm Ansiklopedisi - Official Site 
Description on webpage of Religious Foundation of Turkey (publisher)  

Encyclopedias of Islam
Turkish-language encyclopedias
1988 non-fiction books
20th-century encyclopedias
21st-century encyclopedias